King Hyeon (reigned 316–346) was the last true king of Buyeo. His last name was Buyeo (夫餘) and his first name was Hyeon (玄). During his reign, Buyeo was attacked by former Yan and defeated. After that, Hyeon became the son-in-law of Murong Huang, the King of former Yan.

Biography
The birth and death dates of King Hyeon are not known. His relationship with the king of Uira is also unknown. In 346 AD, Murong Huang, the founder of the former Yan Dynasty, ordered an attack on Buyeo. Buyeo was badly defeated in this war and King Hyeon was captured by the enemy. Murong Huang sent Crown Prince Murong Jun and his fourth son Murong Ke, along with 17,000 men to war with Buyeo. In this attack, 50,000 people of Buyeo were captured and sent to former Yan, thus Buyeo was practically destroyed. To convince the Buyeo refugees, Murong Huang gave his daughter in marriage to King Hyeon and also gave him the title of General jindong (Korean:진동장군 Chinese:鎭東將軍).

In popular culture
Portrayed by Park-yongjin in the 2010-2011 KBS1 TV series The King of Legend.

References
 이도학(李道學), 〈현왕(玄王)에 대하여〉, 《한국역대인물 종합정보시스템》, 한국학중앙연구원
 Zizhi Tongjian, vol. 97.

Buyeo rulers
4th-century people
4th-century Korean people
Date of birth unknown
Date of death unknown

ko:현왕